Owen Township is one of ten townships in Warrick County, Indiana, United States. As of the 2010 census, its population was 611 and it contained 249 housing units.

History
Owen Township was organized in 1848, and named for Robert Dale Owen, an Indiana politician.

Geography

Unincorporated towns
 Dickeyville at 
 Folsomville at 
(This list is based on USGS data and may include former settlements.)

Adjacent townships
 Lane Township (north)
 Pigeon Township (east)
 Skelton Township (southeast)
 Boon Township (southwest)
 Hart Township (west)

Cemeteries
The township contains these four cemeteries: Barrenfork, Leslie, Saint Clair and Shiloh.

Lakes
 Hendrickson Lake

School districts
 Warrick County School Corporation

Political districts
 Indiana's 8th congressional district
 State House District 74
 State Senate District 47

References
 United States Census Bureau 2007 TIGER/Line Shapefiles
 United States Board on Geographic Names (GNIS)
 IndianaMap

External links
 Indiana Township Association
 United Township Association of Indiana

Townships in Warrick County, Indiana
Townships in Indiana